Woodward Maurice "Tex" Ritter (January 12, 1905 – January 2, 1974) was a pioneer of American country music, a popular singer and actor from the mid-1930s into the 1960s, and the patriarch of the Ritter acting family (son John, grandsons Jason and Tyler, and granddaughter Carly). He is a member of the Country Music Hall of Fame.

Early life 
Woodward Maurice Ritter was born on January 12, 1905, in Murvaul, Texas, to Martha Elizabeth (née Matthews) and James Everett Ritter. He grew up on his family's farm in Panola County, Texas, and attended grade school in Carthage, Texas. He attended South Park High School in Beaumont, Texas. After graduating with honors, he entered the University of Texas at Austin in 1922 to study pre-law and major in government, political science, and economics. After traveling to Chicago  with a musical troupe, he entered Northwestern Law School.

Career

Radio and Broadway 
An early pioneer of country music, Ritter soon became interested in show business. In 1928, he sang on KPRC in Houston, Texas, a 30-minute program of mostly cowboy songs. That same year, he moved to New York City and landed a job in the men's chorus of the Broadway show The New Moon (1928). He appeared as cowboy Cord Elam in the Broadway production Green Grow the Lilacs (1931), the basis for the musical Oklahoma! He also played the part of Sagebrush Charlie in The Round Up (1932) and Mother Lode (1934).

In 1932, he starred in New York City's first broadcast Western, The Lone Star Rangers on WOR, where he sang and told tales of the Old West. Ritter wrote and starred in Cowboy Tom's Roundup on WINS in 1933, a daily children's cowboy program aired over two other East Coast stations for three years. He also performed on the radio show WHN Barndance and sang on NBC Radio shows; and appeared in several radio dramas, including CBS's Bobby Benson's Adventures.

Movies 
In 1936, Ritter moved to Los Angeles. His motion picture debut was in Song of the Gringo (1936) for Grand National Pictures.  He went on to appear in 70 movies as an actor, and 76 on movie soundtracks.  He attracted special attention in 1952 for his rendition of "The Ballad of High Noon" over the opening credits of the celebrated film High Noon, and later sang it at that year's Academy Awards ceremony, where it won Best Original Song.

Recording 
Ritter's recording career was his most successful period. He was the first artist signed with the newly formed Capitol Records.

In 1944, he scored a hit with "I'm Wastin' My Tears on You", which hit number one on the country chart and number 11 on the pop chart. An article in the trade publication Billboard noted 14 years later that with that song, he "reached the style of rhythmic tune that would assure his musical stature".

In 1952 Ritter recorded "The Ballad of High Noon" for the film High Noon. He performed the track at the first televised Academy Awards ceremony in 1953, and it received an Oscar for Best Song that year.

Television 
When television began to compete with movies for American audiences, Ritter began to make appearances on the new medium following 71 straight movie appearances. In 1953, he began performing on Town Hall Party on radio and television in Los Angeles. In 1957, he co-hosted Ranch Party, a syndicated version of the show. He made his national TV debut in 1955 on ABC-TV's Ozark Jubilee and was one of five rotating hosts for its 1961 NBC-TV spin-off, Five Star Jubilee.

Later work 
Ritter became one of the founding members of the Country Music Association in Nashville, Tennessee, and spearheaded the effort to build the Country Music Hall of Fame and Museum into which he was inducted in 1964.

He moved to Nashville in 1965 and began working for radio station WSM and the Grand Ole Opry, earning a lifetime membership in the latter in 1970.

Senate campaign 
In 1970, Ritter entered Tennessee's Republican primary election for United States Senate. Despite high name recognition, he lost the nomination to United States Representative Bill Brock, who then defeated the incumbent Senator Albert Gore, Sr. in the general election.

Personal life 

Ritter had a heart attack and died in Nashville in 1974, ten days before his 69th birthday. He was survived by his wife and two sons, one a popular actor John. Following the death of his son John at the age of 54 from an aortic dissection in 2003, the family now believes that Tex died of it as well, as the condition appears to run in the family.

Legacy 
For his contribution to the recording industry, Ritter has a star on the Hollywood Walk of Fame at 6631 Hollywood Boulevard. In 1980, he was inducted into the Western Performers Hall of Fame at the National Cowboy & Western Heritage Museum in Oklahoma City, Oklahoma. He was a member of the charter group of inductees into the Texas Country Music Hall of Fame in Carthage, in 1998.

In 1986, Ritter was honored posthumously with a Golden Boot Award for his work in Western films.

Ritter can still be heard as the voice of Big Al, an audio-animatronic bear, at Disney theme park attraction Country Bear Jamboree at the Magic Kingdom at Walt Disney World, and Tokyo Disneyland in Urayasu, Chiba, Japan, and formerly at Disneyland in Anaheim, California.

Selected filmography 

Song of the Gringo (1936) – Tex
Headin' for the Rio Grande (1936) – Tex Saunders
Arizona Days (1937) – Tex Malinson
Trouble in Texas (1937) – Tex Masters
Hittin' the Trail (1937) – Tex Randall
Sing, Cowboy, Sing (1937) – Tex Archer
Riders of the Rockies (1937) – Tex Rand
The Mystery of the Hooded Horsemen (1937) – Tex Martin
Tex Rides with the Boy Scouts (1937) – Tex Collins
 Frontier Town (1938) – Tex Lansing, alias Tex Rawlins
Rollin' Plains (1938) – Tex Lawrence
The Utah Trail (1938) – Tex Stewart, posing as the Pecos Kid
Starlight Over Texas (1938) – Tex Newman
Where the Buffalo Roam (1938) – Tex Houston
Song of the Buckaroo (1938) – Texas Dan
Sundown on the Prairie (1939) – Tex
Rollin' Westward (1939) – Tex
 Man from Texas (1939) – Tex Allen
Down the Wyoming Trail (1939) – Tex Yancey
Riders of the Frontier (1939) – Tex Lowery
Westbound Stage (1939) – Tex Wallace
Rhythm of the Rio Grande (1940) – Tex Regan
Pals of the Silver Sage (1940) – Tex Wright
The Cowboy from Sundown (1940) – Sheriff Tex Rockett
The Golden Trail (1940) – Tex Roberts
Rainbow Over the Range (1940) – Tex Reed
 Roll Wagons Roll (1940) – Tex Masters
Arizona Frontier (1940) – Tex
Take Me Back to Oklahoma (1940) – Tex Lawton
Rolling Home to Texas (1940) – Tex Reed
Ridin' the Cherokee Trail (1941) – Ranger Lt. Tex Ritter
 The Pioneers (1941) – Tex
King of Dodge City (1941) – Tex Rawlings
Roaring Frontiers (1941) – Tex Martin (listed as Tex Rawlings)
The Lone Star Vigilantes (1942) – Tex Martin
Bullets for Bandits (1942) – Sheriff Tex Martin
North of the Rockies (1942) – Tex Martin
The Devil's Trail (1942) – Marshal Tex Martin
Prairie Gunsmoke (1942) – Tex Terrell
Vengeance of the West (1942) – California Ranger Captain Tex Lake
Deep in the Heart of Texas (1942) – Brent Gordon
Little Joe, the Wrangler (1942) – Sheriff Bob Brewster
The Old Chisholm Trail (1942) – Montana Smith
Tenting Tonight on the Old Camp Ground (1943) – Bob Courtney
Cheyenne Roundup (1943) – Steve Rawlins
Raiders of San Joaquin (1943) – Gil Blake
The Lone Star Trail (1943) – Fargo Steele
Frontier Badmen (1943) – Jerry Kimball (cattle buyer)
Arizona Trail (1943) – Johnnie Trent
Marshal of Gunsmoke (1944) – Marshal Ward Bailey
Cowboy Canteen (1944) – Tex Coulter
Oklahoma Raiders (1944) – Steve Nolan
Gangsters of the Frontier (1944) – Tex Haines
Dead or Alive (1944) – Tex Haines aka Idaho Kid
The Whispering Skull (1944) – Tex Haines
Marked for Murder (1945) – Tex Haines
Enemy of the Law (1945) – Tex Haines
Three in the Saddle (1945) – Tex Haines
Frontier Fugitives (1945) – Texas Ranger Tex Haines
Flaming Bullets (1945) – Texas Ranger Tex Haines
Holiday Rhythm (1950) – Tex Ritter
Buffalo Bill in Tomahawk Territory (1952) – stock footage from "Where the Buffalo Roam" (uncredited, archive footage)
The Marshal's Daughter (1953) – Background Singer (singing voice)
Wichita (1955) – Singer
Apache Ambush (1955) – Traeger
The First Bad Man (1955) – Narrator
Down Liberty Road (1956) – George
Trooper Hook (1957) – Title Song Singer (voice)
Ranch Party (1958, TV Series – regular)
Tom and Jerry (1965, TV Series) – alternate host
Nashville Rebel (1966) – Himself
The Girl from Tobacco Row (1966) – Preacher Bolton
What Am I Bid? (1967) – Tex Ritter
The Marshal of Windy Hollow (1972) – Windy Hollow mayor
Sing a Country Song (1973) – Ryan (final film role)

Discography

Albums

Singles

References

External links 

 
 
 Tex Ritter at The Old Corral (a reference guide for B-Westerns)
 Tex Ritter at the Country Music Hall of Fame
 Tex Ritter Museum – Carthage, Texas
 Tex Ritter / Edward Finney Collection at the Autry Museum of the American West

1905 births
1974 deaths
20th-century American male actors
20th-century American singers
20th-century American male singers
American actor-politicians
American country singer-songwriters
American male film actors
American male singer-songwriters
American male television actors
Columbia Pictures contract players
Candidates in the 1970 United States elections
Capitol Records artists
Country Music Hall of Fame inductees
Decca Records artists
Grand Ole Opry members
Male Western (genre) film actors
Members of the Country Music Association
People from Beaumont, Texas
People from Carthage, Texas
People from Nashville, Tennessee
People from Panola County, Texas
Shasta Records artists
Singing cowboys
Singer-songwriters from Tennessee
Singer-songwriters from Texas
Tennessee Republicans
University of Texas at Austin College of Liberal Arts alumni